Kip E. Tom served as the United States Ambassador to the United Nations Agencies for Food and Agriculture, and chief of the United States Mission to the UN Agencies in Rome, from 2019 to 2021.

The United Nations has six different food and agricultural development agencies.  The US has significant involvement with the Food and Agriculture Organization (FAO).  As a result, there is political and economic staff from the State Department, as well as staff from USDA and the U.S. Agency for International Development.

Before his appointment, Tom was chief executive officer of Indiana-based Tom Farms, which is among Indiana's largest farming operations and “a leading supplier to Monsanto.”  In 2016, he ran against Jim Banks in the Republican primary for the Indiana's 3rd congressional district coming in “a close second.”

References

External links
The New Hoosier Farmer: Is Kind of a Big Deal

Representatives of the United States to the United Nations Agencies for Food and Agriculture
American chief executives
People from Kosciusko County, Indiana
Living people
1955 births